Ralph Waldo Emerson Gilbert (January 17, 1882 – July 30, 1939) was a U.S. Representative from Kentucky, son of George Gilmore Gilbert.

Born in Taylorsville, Kentucky, Gilbert attended the public schools and the University of Virginia at Charlottesville.
He was graduated from the law school of the University of Louisville in 1901.
He was admitted to the bar the same year and commenced practice in Shelbyville, Kentucky.

Gilbert was elected judge of the Shelby County Court in 1910.
He was reelected in 1914 and served until his resignation in 1917.

Gilbert was elected as a Democrat to the Sixty-seventh and to the three succeeding Congresses (March 4, 1921 – March 3, 1929).
He was an unsuccessful candidate for reelection in 1928 to the Seventy-first Congress.
He served as member of the Kentucky House of Representatives in 1929.

Gilbert was elected to the Seventy-second Congress (March 4, 1931 – March 3, 1933).
He was not a candidate for renomination in 1932.
He resumed the practice of law in Shelbyville, Kentucky.
He again served in the Kentucky House of Representatives in 1933.

Gilbert was elected a member of the Kentucky Senate in 1936 and served until his death in Louisville, Kentucky, July 30, 1939.
He was interred in Grove Hill Cemetery, Shelbyville, Kentucky.

References

1882 births
1939 deaths
Democratic Party members of the Kentucky House of Representatives
Kentucky lawyers
Kentucky state court judges
Democratic Party Kentucky state senators
Democratic Party members of the United States House of Representatives from Kentucky
People from Taylorsville, Kentucky
People from Shelbyville, Kentucky
20th-century American judges
20th-century American politicians
20th-century American lawyers